"Kiss! Kiss! Kiss!" is a song by the Hello! Project unit Buono! from their album Buono! 2 (2009). The song was written by Yūho Iwasato, Shinjirō Inoue, and Susumu Nishikawa and produced by Tsunku. It was released on May 14, 2008 as the album's third single. The Single V (PCBP.51918) was released on June 18, 2008. The single peaked at number four on the weekly Oricon charts, and charted for six weeks.

Release
The single was released on May 14, 2008 in Japan under the Pony Canyon label in two different versions: regular (PCCA.70215) and limited (PCCA.02672). The normal edition came with only the normal CD, while the limited edition was packaged with a special DVD. Both the limited edition and first press of the regular edition came with a serial number card, used in a promotional draw, and a Buono! trading card.

"Kiss! Kiss! Kiss!" was used as the third ending theme of the anime Shugo Chara! (2006-2009). "Minna Daisuki", the B-side, was used as the second opening theme. The PV was shot on-location in a real school.

Track listings

CD

Limited edition DVD

Single V

Live performances 
 2008-05-15 Music Japan
 2008-05-16 Music Fighter

Oricon rank and Sales (Single CD)

Oricon rank and sales (Single V)

References

Songs about kissing
2008 singles
Shugo Chara!
Buono! songs
Song recordings produced by Tsunku
Songs with lyrics by Yuho Iwasato
2008 songs
Pony Canyon singles

pl:Kiss! Kiss! Kiss!